Werner Moser (born 22 December 1950) is an Austrian bobsledder. He competed in the four man event at the 1972 Winter Olympics.

References

1950 births
Living people
Austrian male bobsledders
Olympic bobsledders of Austria
Bobsledders at the 1972 Winter Olympics
Place of birth missing (living people)